Diocesan College, also known as the College of St. Francis de Sales, is a private Catholic primary and secondary school located in Teresina, Piauí, Brazil. The school was founded in 1906 by the Jesuits.

Its Saraiva Square campus opened in 1925 and in 2003 a campus for two to six year olds was opened on Benjamin Constant Street.

History
In 1906, the first bishop of Piauí, Antonio Joaquim D'Almeida, founded the school along with the diocesan seminary. In 1914 the second bishop of Piauí closed the school for lack of funds, and took up residence in the building which has since had his court of arms on its facade. The third bishop of Piauí, Dom Severino Vieira de Melo, reopened the school in 1925 under the name of St. Francis de Sales, running a boarding school.

In 1945, the scientific and classic courses along with the technical trade school were initiated, including a course in accounting. At this time, a group of students also founded New People magazine. In the late 1950s, the boarding house was closed.

From October 1959 until early 1960, the school had its first lay director, Bernardo Lopes de Sousa, who administered the school during the transition period until the arrival of the Jesuit fathers in 1960. Since then it has networked with Jesuit schools.

The school's children's division was opened in 2003. Today it serves more than 600 students between two and six years old.

In 2015, the school placed twelfth in Piauí state in the national secondary school examination (Exame Nacional do Ensino Médio).

See also

 Catholic Church in Brazil
 Education in Brazil
 List of Jesuit educational institutions
 List of schools in Brazil

References

External links
 

1906 establishments in Brazil
Buildings and structures in Piauí
Education in Piauí
Educational institutions established in 1906
Jesuit schools in Brazil
Mixed-sex education
Catholic boarding schools
Catholic primary schools in Brazil
Catholic secondary schools in Brazil
Teresina